Abdullah Alkhalifa Alsabah Satduim is a multi-use stadium in Mishref, Kuwait.  It is currently used mostly for football matches and is the home stadium of Al Yarmouk.  The stadium holds 15,000 spectators.

References

External links
Stadium information

Football venues in Kuwait